Magnolia calophylla is a species of plant in the family Magnoliaceae. It is endemic to Colombia.

References

calophylla
Endemic flora of Colombia
Vulnerable plants
Taxonomy articles created by Polbot